Wolf was a wolfpack of German U-boats that operated from 13 July to 1 August 1942, attacking Convoy ON 115 in the Battle of the Atlantic during World War II. They sank two ships sunk totalling  and damaged another.

U-Boats & Commanders
The wolfpack comprised eleven U-boats, namely

Ships hit by this wolfpack

British Merit
One man was killed by the explosion and another seriously injured. The tug HMS Frisky (W11) took her into St. Johns, arriving on 2 August.

Broompark
U-552 struck again at 04:09 hours on 25 July, hitting the 5,136-ton British merchant ship Broompark. The ship was taken in tow by the tug , but sank on 28 July about  SW of St. Johns. The master and three men were lost, while 38 men and 7 gunners were picked up by HMCS Brandon.

Empire Rainbow
At 07.57 hours on 26 July the 6,942-ton British merchant ship Empire Rainbow was hit and damaged by a torpedo fired by  about  E of Cape Race.

References

Wolfpacks of 1942